On August 2, 1919, a Caproni Ca.48 airliner crashed at Verona, Italy. All aboard died, with various sources placing the death toll at 14, 15, and 17. It was Italy‘s first commercial aviation disaster and the earliest heavier-than-air airliner disaster in history.

Flight history

The Caproni Ca.48, owned and operated by the Caproni company and flown by two Italian military pilots, took off from the companys home airfield at Taliedo, a district of Milan, Italy, on Saturday, August 2, 1919, at 7:30 a.m. local time for a flight to Venice, where it arrived without incident at 9:22 a.m. After spending the day at Venice, the aircraft took off at 5:00 p.m. for the return flight to Taliedo.
Several of the people on board jumped from the aircraft to their deaths before it crashed. There were no survivors.

Aircraft

The Ca.48, a large triplane, was an airliner conversion of the Caproni Ca.42 variant of the Caproni Ca.4 heavy bomber; such bombers had seen service with the air component of the Italian Army during World War I in strikes against targets in Austria-Hungary, as well as with the British Royal Naval Air Service. Caproni carried out the Ca. 48 airliner conversion by removing all armament and mounting a double-deck cabin with large windows and seating for 23 passengers on the aircraft. Although it generated excitement when first introduced to the public, the Ca.48 probably never entered airline service.

Casualties

Sources agree that everyone aboard died in the crash, but differ on the number of people on board. A source published five days after the accident claims that 14 people – the airliner's two pilots; five prominent Italian journalists, among them Tullo Morgagni; and seven Caproni company mechanics – were on board. Later sources place the death toll at 15 and 17 without further explanation.

Notes

References

The civilian transport aircraft of Caproni (1918-1939)
Flight, August 7, 1919, at flightglobal.com
Venice Airport Lido: On the Wings of the Sparrow
Guttman, Jon, "Crazy Capronis," Aviation History, July 2008.

Aviation accidents and incidents in 1919
Aviation accidents and incidents in Italy
Accidents and incidents by airline of Italy
Airliner accidents and incidents caused by in-flight structural failure
1919 in Italy
History of Verona
August 1919 events